NOVA Chemicals Corporation is a Canadian petrochemical company that has been in operation since 1954. NOVA was formed as provincial crown corporation called the Alberta Gas Trunk Line Company Limited to manage Alberta's natural gas collection system. During the 1970s, the company diversified into petroleum exploration and production, manufacturing, and petrochemicals. In 1980 the AGTL was renamed NOVA, An Alberta Corporation. After a decade of financial struggles, in 1998 NOVA sold its petroleum and pipeline business to TransCanada Pipelines and continued as solely a petrochemicals operation. The gas collection system run by TransCanada is now called the NOVA Gas Transmission Line.

NOVA Chemicals' products are used in a wide variety of applications, including food and electronics packaging, industrial materials, appliances and a variety of consumer goods. The company operates two business units and holds a 50% interest in a major joint venture with INEOS, called INEOS NOVA.

Company history
In 1954, the Alberta legislature under Ernest Manning passed the Alberta Gas Trunk Line Company Act, creating the Alberta Gas Trunk Line Company (AGTL) Crown Corporation, with a monopoly on natural gas transportation (pipelines) within the province. Construction began in 1956 and gas began flowing in 1957. In the 1970s, AGTL expanded into the chemicals industry.  The company was privatized in 1961 and was renamed NOVA Corporation in 1980, and by 1989 was considered a "petrochemical and pipeline giant."

In the 1980s, NOVA had controlling ownership of Calgary-based Husky Oil. NOVA sold the last of its stake in Husky in 1991.

In 1998, NOVA Corporation split in two, with its pipeline business (with $11 billion in annual sales) merging with TransCanada Pipelines and its chemicals business ($2.4 billion sales) becoming a publicly traded company, NOVA Chemicals.  Shortly after the split, then-CEO Jeffrey Lipton moved NOVA Chemicals' head office from Calgary to Pittsburgh, Pennsylvania. While this move was made in order to be closer to US customers, the benefits of the move never materialized.  It was also seen as a snub to the province of Alberta, as Premier Ed Stelmach refused to grant NOVA Chemicals a bailout in 2009 due to the financial meltdown and recession, as well as the company's heavy debt load.

On July 6, 2009, the International Petroleum Investment Company (since 2016 IPIC merged with Mubadala), which is wholly owned by the government of the Emirate of Abu Dhabi, completed the 100% purchase of NOVA Chemicals, and transferred its place of incorporation to the Province of New Brunswick.

In the United States, NOVA Chemicals has focused recent expansion in the Gulf Coast area.  This includes acquiring an olefins plant that produces roughly 1.95 billion pounds of ethylene annually in Geismar, Louisiana, which was purchased from Williams Partners.  The company is also considering the building of a new polyethylene plant in St. Clair Township.

Operations

The Olefins/Polyolefins
The Olefins/Polyolefins business unit produces and sells ethylene, PE resins and co-products from its two manufacturing centers located in Alberta and Ontario, Canada. The business is built on its  feedstock cost advantage in Alberta, world-scale and energy-efficient manufacturing facilities and proprietary Advanced SCLAIRTECH and gas-phase polyethylene technology.

The Olefins/Polyolefins business unit contains three reporting segments:
Joffre Olefins, which produces and sells ethylene and co-products and includes the Joffre, Alberta, site's three ethylene crackers.
Corunna Olefins, which produces and sells ethylene and co-products and includes the Corunna, Ontario, ethylene flexi-cracker.
Polyethylene, which produces and sells PE and includes both the Alberta and Ontario based PE assets. In addition, the Polyethylene segment licenses its proprietary process technology and catalysts.

Leadership

Chairman of the Board 
Robert J. Dinning, 1955–1963
vacant, 1963–1966
John C. Mayne, 1966–1974
H. J. Sanders Pearson, 1974–1985
S. Robert Blair, 1985–1991
Daryl K. Seaman, 1991–1992
Richard F. Haskayne, 1992–1998
J. Edward Newall, 1998–2007
James M. Stanford, 2007–2009
Khadem A. al-Qubaisi, 2009–2015
Suhail M. Al Mazrouei, 2015–2020
Musabbeh Al Kaabi, 2020–2021
Ahmed Yahia Al Idrissi, 2021–

President 
Ralph F. Will, 1954–1956
Vernon Taylor, 1956–1958
Alex G. Bailey, 1958–1966
James C. Mahaffy, 1966–1970
S. Robert Blair, 1970–1986
Robert L. Pierce, 1986–1988
James H. Butler, 1988–1990
vacant, 1990–1991
J. Edward Newall, 1991–1998
Jeffrey M. Lipton, 1998–2008
Christopher D. Pappas, 2008–2009
Randy G. Woelfel, 2009–2014
Todd D. Karran, 2015–2020
Luis M. Sierra, 2020–2022
Danny Dweik, 2022–

References

Plastics companies of Canada
Companies based in Calgary
Chemical companies established in 1954

1954 establishments in Alberta
Sovereign wealth fund portfolio companies
Former Crown corporations of Canada